Éric Girard (born 1970) is a Canadian politician, who was elected to the National Assembly of Quebec in the 2018 provincial election. He represents the electoral district of Lac-Saint-Jean as a member of the Coalition Avenir Québec.

References

Living people
Coalition Avenir Québec MNAs
21st-century Canadian politicians
People from Saguenay–Lac-Saint-Jean
1970 births